"Knife Talk" is a song by Canadian rapper Drake featuring Atlanta-based rapper 21 Savage and American rapper Project Pat. Produced by Metro Boomin and Peter Lee Johnson, it was released on September 3, 2021 as the thirteenth track from the former's sixth studio album Certified Lover Boy.

Background
The song was originally planned to appear on 21 Savage and Metro Boomin's collaboration album Savage Mode II. The official music video was released on November 4, 2021.

Composition 
"Knife Talk" contains a sample from "Feed the Streets", written by Jordan Houston (Juicy J), Patrick Houston (Project Pat), Rakim Mayers (A$AP Rocky) and Leland Wayne (Metro Boomin), as performed by the former three and, like this song, co-produced by the latter.

Charts

Weekly charts

Year-end charts

Certifications

References

2021 singles
2021 songs
Drake (musician) songs
21 Savage songs
Project Pat songs
Song recordings produced by Metro Boomin
Songs written by 21 Savage
Songs written by Drake (musician)
Songs written by Project Pat
Songs written by Metro Boomin
Songs written by Juicy J
Songs written by ASAP Rocky